Apotome may refer to:
 Apotome (mathematics) a mathematical term used by Euclid.
 Apotome (music)
 Apotome (optics) used for increasing axial resolution of fluorescence microscopy of thick specimens by structured illumination.